Ousmanou Mohamadou is a Cameroonian professional football striker.

Club career

Phnom Penh
In early 2008 the 19-year-old Cameroonian striker was signed by Cambodian side Phnom Penh Crown FC for which he scored 18 goals in 23 appearances and gave 5 assists. It was Phnom Penh's most successful season ever with winning the league and cup title. On 7 September 2009 Mohamadou scored a hattrick in Phnom Penh's stunning 6:3 win over Spark

Ubon Ratchathani
In 2013 Mohamadou moved to Ubon UMT for which he scored 13 goals and 8 assists in 26 appearances in the 2013 Thai Division 2 League North Eastern Region.

Australia

Mohamadou currently plays for Australian BOSA FC in the South Australian Amateur Soccer League.

References

Association football forwards
Cameroonian expatriate footballers
Cameroonian footballers
Living people
Phnom Penh Crown FC players
Year of birth missing (living people)